Events in the year 1979 in Portugal.

Incumbents
President: António Ramalho Eanes
Prime Minister: Carlos Mota Pinto (until 1 August), Maria de Lourdes Pintasilgo (since 1 August)

Events
 1 August - Establishment of the V Constitutional Government of Portugal.

Culture
Portugal participated in the Eurovision Song Contest 1979 with Manuela Bravo and the song "Sobe, sobe, balão sobe".

Sports
In association football, for the first-tier league seasons, see 1978–79 Primeira Divisão and 1979–80 Primeira Divisão.

References

 
Portugal
Years of the 20th century in Portugal
Portugal